Hunter Creek is a stream in northwest Wayne County in the U.S. state of Missouri. It is a tributary of the St. Francis River.

Just east of the confluence the stream crosses under US Route 67 north of the community of Lodi.

Hunter Creek is named for John Hunter, an early citizen.

See also
List of rivers of Missouri

References

Rivers of Wayne County, Missouri
Rivers of Missouri